is the 11th single by Japanese singer Yōko Oginome. Written by Masao Urino and Minoru Yamazaki, the single was released on March 3, 1987 by Victor Entertainment.

Background and release
Like her previous single "Roppongi Junjōha", "Wangan Taiyōzoku" peaked at No. 3 on Oricon's singles chart, making it Oginome's highest-charting single until "Sayonara no Kajitsutachi" hit No. 1 later that year. It also sold over 162,000 copies.

The B-side, "Konayuki no Resort", was used as an image song for Morinaga High Crown Chocolate.

Track listing

Charts
Weekly charts

Year-end charts

References

External links

1987 singles
Yōko Oginome songs
Japanese-language songs
Songs with lyrics by Masao Urino
Victor Entertainment singles